Artoria Gibbons (also known by her stage name, Mrs. C.W. (Red) Gibbons) was an American tattooed lady. She worked at carnival sideshows and at circuses for more than 35 years, including the Ringling, Barnum & Bailey Brothers Circus from 1921 to 1923 and the Hagenbeck–Wallace Circus in 1924.

She was born Anna Mae Burlingston in Linwood, Wisconsin in 1893 to Gunder Huseland, a Norwegian immigrant who used the name Frank Burlington, and Amma Mabel Mason. Her father was a farmer. She and her husband, a tattoo artist, were married in Spokane in 1912. She was the first tattooed lady to perform in his local carnival sideshow.  Her tattoos, which covered 80% of her body, imitated paintings by Raphael and Michelangelo. She was one of the highest-paid tattooed ladies of her time.

Gibbons continued to perform until her death in 1985.

References

American circus performers
People from Portage County, Wisconsin
1893 births
1985 deaths
American people of Norwegian descent
People known for being heavily tattooed